Beth Israel Cemetery is a Jewish cemetery in southwest Portland, Oregon, in the United States.

Notable burials

 Caroline Burke (1913–1964), actress, theater producer, and art collector
 Henry Heppner (c. 1831–1905) Businessman and namesake for Heppner, Oregon.
 Solomon Hirsch (1839–1902), community leader
 Julius Meier (1874–1937), Governor of Oregon
 Maurine Neuberger (1907–2000), US Senator
 Richard L. Neuberger (1912–1960), US Senator and author
 Joseph Simon (1851–1935), US Senator

See also
 Beth Israel School
 Congregation Beth Israel (Portland, Oregon)

References

External links

 
 

Cemeteries in Portland, Oregon
Jewish cemeteries in Oregon
Jews and Judaism in Portland, Oregon
Southwest Portland, Oregon